Karin Harmsen-Roosen (born 11 March 1962) is a Dutch female Paralympic sitting volleyball player. She is part of the Netherlands women's national sitting volleyball team.

She competed at the  2008 Summer Paralympics finishing third,

References

External links
 

Living people
Dutch amputees
Dutch sitting volleyball players
Dutch sportswomen
Medalists at the 2008 Summer Paralympics
Paralympic volleyball players of the Netherlands
Volleyball players at the 2008 Summer Paralympics
Women's sitting volleyball players
1962 births
Paralympic medalists in volleyball
Paralympic bronze medalists for the Netherlands
20th-century Dutch women
21st-century Dutch women